Liam Tuohy (born in Dublin, Ireland) is an Irish stage, television and film actor who played the role of Chief Baker Charles Joughin in James Cameron's 1997 blockbuster film Titanic. In addition to acting, Tuohy is also known for being a renowned Radio and Club Disc-Jockey, DJ Lee, in his native Ireland, and an accomplished journalist, known for writing his semi-autobiographical screenplay A Jack to a King along with several others.

Credits

Film
Titanic (1997) .... Chief Baker Charles Joughin
The Souler Opposite (1998) .... Yoga Pupil
It Could Happen (2002) .... Mickser
Red Eye (2005) .... Airline Passenger (uncredited)
Never Judge a Book (2005) .... Senior Policeman
The Still Life (2006) .... Bar Patron
Chase 'n Madi (2006) .... George Morrison
The Old Son (2007) .... Tom
Manband! The Movie (2007) .... Barfly
For Christ's Sake (2010) .... Bishop Duffin

Television
The Weird Al Show (1997) .... Swimmer (uncredited)
Platinum London Boots (Japanese television)

Stage
Other People's Money
Picasso at the Lapin Agile
A staging of  Ulysses

External links
 

Living people
Male actors from Dublin (city)
Irish male film actors
Irish male stage actors
Irish male television actors
1939 births